Lovedale railway station is a railway station serving Lovedale, a town located south of Udhagamandalam (Ooty), in the Nilgiris district of Tamil Nadu. A notable tourist attraction, it is one of the stations of the Nilgiri Mountain Railway, built in 1907, and is a UNESCO declared World Heritage Site. It is one of the halts for the historic Ooty passenger. It is maintained and administered by the Southern Railway zone and comes under the Salem railway division. The station code is: LOV.

Trains

Notes

Railway stations in Nilgiris district
Railway stations opened in 1908
1908 establishments in India
Mountain railways in India